John Ormond Kennedy (born 16 November 1947) is an Australian politician and member of the Labor Party. He was elected as member of the Victorian Legislative Assembly in November 2018, representing the seat of Hawthorn until 2022.

Kennedy succeeded incumbent Liberal MP John Pesutto in November 2018. He is only the second Labor member ever to win this traditional blue-ribbon Liberal seat, and the first in 63 years.
 
Kennedy worked as a teacher before entering politics, and served as the founding principal of Loyola College for nearly thirty years (1979–2008). He stood in the 2013 federal election for the blue-ribbon Liberal seat of Kooyong, losing to Liberal incumbent Josh Frydenberg.

Kennedy is a member of ABC Friends (previously Friends of the ABC), the Graduate Union of The University of Melbourne Inc, Labor for Refugees, and Labor for a Republic and a monthly contributor to Médecins Sans Frontières and the United Nations High Commission for Refugees. He is not a member of one of Labor’s factions. 

Kennedy has stated that his top policy priorities are education and public transport.

Career
Kennedy holds a Bachelor of Arts from the University of Sydney, Bachelor of Education from the University of Melbourne, Bachelor of Theology from the United Faculty of Theology of the Melbourne College of Divinity and a Master of Educational Leadership from Australian Catholic University.

Kennedy began his career as a teacher at St. Ignatius College from 1969 to 1975 while working as Assistant Housemaster at Sydney Church of England Grammar School from 1970 to 1975. From 1976 to 1979 he resided at St Mary's College (Melbourne University) in the part-time position as Dean of Studies while also serving as Deputy Principal of St. Columba's College.

Kennedy graduated from the Sydney University Squadron as a Pilot Officer in 1970 and was promoted to Flight Lieutenant in RAAF Active Reserve in 1978. 

Kennedy served as the founding Principal of Loyola College, working at the school from 1979 to 2008.

Kennedy worked as a consultant for non-profit organisations, including work in leadership, governance and management in the education sector before being elected to Victorian Parliament in November 2018.

Personal life
Kennedy was born in Sydney in 1947, attended Loreto Kirribilli in 1953–55 and St Aloysius College in 1956–65 and moved to Melbourne in 1976.

Kennedy lives in the eastern suburb of Hawthorn with his wife Bronwyn Lane, and has two children and one grandchild.

At the time of his 2018 election victory, Kennedy resided in a retirement village and did not have a smartphone. Kennedy commutes on public transport, as he has never obtained his drivers’ licence.

In December 2021, Kennedy suffered a heart attack while walking with his wife on a Sydney holiday. After being assisted by a doctor and off-duty police officer who happened to be walking past at the time, Kennedy spent six days in hospital. He returned to work on January 24.

At the 2022 Victorian state election, Kennedy recontested Hawthorn but eventually lost to predecessor John Pesutto who faced a strong challenge from independent Melissa Lowe and received 21.6 per cent of the primary vote.

References

1947 births
Living people
Australian Labor Party members of the Parliament of Victoria
Members of the Victorian Legislative Assembly
21st-century Australian politicians
People educated at St Aloysius' College (Sydney)
Politicians from Sydney
University of Melbourne alumni politicians
Australian Catholic University alumni
University of Sydney alumni
Australian headmasters
People from Hawthorn, Victoria